Charrier is a French surname. Notable people with the surname include:

Anne Charrier, French actress
Cécile Charrier (born 1983), French neuroscientist researcher
Charly Charrier (born 1986), French footballer
Fernando Charrier (1931–2011), Italian Roman Catholic bishop
Jacques Charrier (born 1936), French actor
René Charrier (born 1951), French footballer
Reynaldo Charrier (born 1945), Chilean geologist

French-language surnames